Balikli may refer to:

 Balıklı, Istanbul
 Church of St. Mary of the Spring (Istanbul) or 
 Balıklı, Altıeylül
 Balıklı, Çayırlı
 Balıklı, Ezine
 Zorakert or Balikli, a town in the Shirak Province of Armenia